"Funhouse" is the 26th episode of the HBO television series The Sopranos, and the season finale of the show's second season. It was co-written by series creator/executive producer David Chase and co-producer Todd A. Kessler, and directed by frequent The Sopranos director John Patterson, and originally aired in the United States on April 9, 2000, attracting about 9 million viewers.

Starring
 James Gandolfini as Tony Soprano
 Lorraine Bracco as Dr. Jennifer Melfi
 Edie Falco as Carmela Soprano
 Michael Imperioli as Christopher Moltisanti
 Dominic Chianese as Corrado Soprano, Jr.
 Vincent Pastore as Pussy Bonpensiero
 Steven Van Zandt as Silvio Dante
 Tony Sirico as Paulie Gualtieri
 Robert Iler as Anthony Soprano, Jr.
 Jamie-Lynn Sigler as Meadow Soprano
 Drea de Matteo as Adriana La Cerva
 Nancy Marchand as Livia Soprano

Guest starring
 Jerry Adler as Hesh Rabkin
 John Ventimiglia as Artie Bucco

Also guest starring

Synopsis
Tony is sick from food poisoning, and he has vivid fever dreams. In one he is having sex with Dr. Melfi in her office. In another, a dead fish on a slab speaks to him with Pussy's voice and says he is working for the government and Tony knows it; that is why Tony passed him over for promotion. As soon as he can, Tony goes with Silvio to Pussy's home. Pretending he is still sick, Tony rushes to the toilet; while the rest are downstairs, he searches the bedroom and finds Pussy's wire.

Tony says he wants Pussy to see a boat he is thinking of buying, and the three of them drive to it. Paulie is already there. They take the boat out to open water.  In the cabin, Tony asks Pussy when he flipped. After hesitating, he says it was eighteen months ago, less, and he only supplied disinformation; but he admits that he told them about the crew's current money-earning scam involving telephone calling cards. He asks for a drink and Tony permits it; he tells a smutty story and the guys laugh. He goes to the other end of the cabin and while he is asking if he can sit down. Tony, followed by Silvio and Paulie, shoot him dead. Paulie removes his identifying jewelry, and together they bind his bagged body in chains and weights, throw him off the back of the boat, and watch him sink into the ocean.

Meadow graduates from high school. At the ceremony, Tony tells Christopher that he is putting him up to become a made man. He also meets Davey, whose wife has left him: he is going to work "on a ranch out West" where there are flights to Las Vegas. His son, who was accepted by Georgetown University, is going to Montclair State University instead because of "a money pinch".

Shortly after Janice's departure, Tony and his younger sister Barbara arrive at Livia's home to discuss her permanent living arrangements. Barbara's husband won't allow her to live with them and the retirement home will not have her back. Angrily, Tony gives her two airline tickets with which she and her sister can fly first-class to Tucson, where another sister is living. But the tickets were obtained through the bust-out of Davey's store, and Livia is detained at Newark International Airport for possessing stolen airline tickets. FBI agents arrive at Tony's home with a search warrant and he is led away handcuffed in front of Meadow and some of her friends. Her graduation ceremony and party are the next day, but he is released in time for both, assured by his lawyer he will get past this.

First appearances
 Quintina Blundetto: Younger sister of Livia Soprano and mother of Tony's cousin Tony Blundetto.
 Pasquale "Patsy" Parisi: Soldier in the Soprano/Gualtieri crew and twin brother of the deceased Philly "Spoons" Parisi.

Deceased
 Salvatore "Big Pussy" Bonpensiero: executed by Tony, Silvio and Paulie for being an FBI informant. His body was then weighted down and tossed into the ocean.

Title reference
 In Tony's dream, he is on the boardwalk in Asbury Park, near the Palace Amusements funhouse with the famous wide-eyed clown painted on it known as "Tillie".
In the scene when Tony's mother calls his home for help about the stolen airline tickets, Carmela answers the phone. When she hands the phone to Tony, she says: "Fun never stops".

Production
 David Proval and Aida Turturro are no longer billed in the opening credits, although Turturro returns next season as a full-time cast member.
 This is the last episode to air while Nancy Marchand was alive.  Her season 3 appearance used old archived footage.

References to past episodes
 Just as in the season opener, "Guy Walks Into a Psychiatrist's Office...", Silvio does his The Godfather Part III Michael Corleone impersonation in the dream.
 Tony's dream where Pussy appears as a fish, saying that the other fishes around him are "asleep" mirror a quote from The Godfather which Pussy corrected to Christopher while helping to dispose of Emil Kolar's corpse in the pilot episode: "Luca Brasi sleeps with the fishes".

Historical reference
 Speaking to Neil Mink, Tony mentions "that EgyptAir thing". This refers to EgyptAir Flight 990, a flight from Los Angeles to Cairo which crashed in October 1999.

Music
The song played throughout the episode, including the end credits, is "Thru and Thru" from the 1994 album Voodoo Lounge by The Rolling Stones (and is sung by Keith Richards).
 The song played on the radio of Tony's car and in his last "fever dream" is "Free Fallin'" by Tom Petty.
 The song that Pussy puts in the CD player and plays in the background while he confesses to being an informant is "Baubles, Bangles and Beads" by Frank Sinatra and Tom Jobim.
 The song Meadow listens to on the radio in her room while she is sulking after Tony is arrested in front of her friends is "Diamonds & Rust" by Joan Baez.
 Tony deliriously sings the theme song from Gilligan's Island as he falls asleep after Dr. Cusamano visits his house to diagnose his illness.  
 When Tony leaves Dr. Melfi's office after retaliating when he feels she insulted him, he sings "Maybe Baby" by Buddy Holly and The Crickets.
 After killing Pussy Bonpensiero, Tony watches a 1960s broadcast of The Temptations on television, performing "Ain't Too Proud to Beg".

Filming locations 
Listed in order of first appearance:

 Verona, New Jersey
 Jersey City, New Jersey
 Belleville Turnpike Bridge over the Passaic River
 Long Island City, Queens
 Asbury Park, New Jersey
 Asbury Park Convention Hall
 Meadowlands Racetrack (as Newark International Airport)
 Monmouth Beach, New Jersey
 Newark, New Jersey
 Wayne, New Jersey

Reception

Critical response
Entertainment Weekly placed "Funhouse" #5 on their list of the 10 greatest The Sopranos episodes; Time placed it at #9.

It was nominated for an Emmy Award in the category of Outstanding Writing for a Drama Series.

Awards
This episode was one of two viewer's choice winners on A&E, along with "Pine Barrens".

References

External links
"Funhouse"  at HBO

The Sopranos (season 2) episodes
2000 American television episodes
Television episodes written by David Chase
Television episodes directed by John Patterson (director)